NYK Venus was one of the largest container ships in the world when it was delivered to its operator, Venus Container Shipping. The NYK Venus is owned by Nippon Yusen Kaisa (sometimes known as NYK Line) of Japan.

Hull and Engine
The NYK Venus was built by Hyundai Heavy Industries. It is a fully cellular container ship at 338 m in length and 46 m beam, with a capacity of 9,012 TEU including 854 refrigerated compartments.

The vessel is powered by a MAN B&W 12K98MC engine, capable of producing 64,033 kW (87,059 hp) driving one fixed propeller. This two-stroke, 12-cylinder engine was built by Hyundai Heavy Industries. The vessel uses 5 auxiliary a/c generators.

References 

Container ships
Ships of the NYK Line
2006 ships